Schistura ndawgyiana is a species of stone loach in the genus Schistura which has only been recorded from a single tributary of Lake Indawgyi in Kachin State, Myanmar. It was described by the Belgian ichthyologist Maurice Kottelat in 2017 and does not feature in Fishbase yet.

References 

I
Taxa named by Maurice Kottelat
Fish described in 2017